The Korkine–Zolotarev (KZ) lattice basis reduction algorithm or Hermite-Korkine–Zolotarev (HKZ) algorithm is a lattice reduction algorithm.

For lattices in  it yields a lattice basis with orthogonality defect at most , unlike the  bound of the LLL reduction. KZ has exponential complexity versus the polynomial complexity of the LLL reduction algorithm, however it may still be preferred for solving sequences of Closest Vector Problems (CVPs) in a lattice, where it can be more efficient.

History

The definition of a KZ-reduced basis was given by A. Korkine and G. Zolotareff in 1877, a strengthened version of Hermite reduction. The first algorithm for constructing a KZ-reduced basis was given in 1983 by Kannan.

The Block Korkine-Zolotarev (BKZ) algorithm was introduced in 1987.

Definition

A KZ-reduced basis for a lattice is defined as follows:

Given a basis

define its Gram–Schmidt process orthogonal basis

and the Gram-Schmidt coefficients
, for any .

Also define projection functions

Then the basis  is KZ-reduced if the following holds:

  is the shortest nonzero vector in 
 For all , 

Also note that the second condition guarantees that the reduced basis is length-reduced (adding an integer multiple of one basis vector to another will not decrease its length); the same condition is used in the LLL reduction.

Notes

References

 

 

 

 

 

Theory of cryptography
Computational number theory
Lattice points